is a railway station on the Chūō Main Line in the city of Ōtsuki, Yamanashi, Japan, jointly operated by the East Japan Railway Company (JR East) and Fuji Kyuko.

Lines
Ōtsuki Station is served by the Chūō Main Line (including Chūō Line (Rapid) services) from Tokyo, and is 87.8 rail kilometers from the terminus of the line at Tokyo Station on the Chūō Main Line.

Kaiji limited express services and some Azusa and Super Azusa limited express services stop at this station.

Station layout

The JR East section of the station consists of one side platform and one island platform serving three tracks, connected by a footbridge. The station has a Midori no Madoguchi staffed ticket office.

The Fujikyuko section of the station consists of a single island platform serving two terminating tracks, and also shares Platform 3, the side platform, with JR East.

Platforms

Station history
Ōtsuki Station opened on 1 October 1902. The Fujikyuko station opened on 19 June 1929.

Passenger statistics
In fiscal 2017, the JR East station was used by an average of 5,377 passengers daily (boarding passengers only). The Fujiyuko portion of the station was used by an average of 3417  passengers daily (boarding passengers only) in 2016。

The passenger figures for JR East in previous years are as shown below.

Surrounding area
 Ōtsuki City Office
 Ohtsuki City College

References

 Miyoshi Kozo. Chuo-sen Machi to eki Hyaku-niju nen. JT Publishing (2009)

External links

 Ōtsuki Station information (JR East) 
 Fujikyuko station information Ōtsuki Station information (Fujikyuko ) 

Railway stations in Yamanashi Prefecture
Railway stations in Japan opened in 1902
Chūō Main Line
Stations of Fuji Kyuko
Ōtsuki, Yamanashi